Gunanand Thakur  was an Indian politician. He was a Member of Parliament, representing Saharsa, Bihar in the Lok Sabha the lower house of India's Parliament as a member of the Samyukta Socialist Party.

References

External links
Official biographical sketch in Parliament of India website

India MPs 1967–1970
Lok Sabha members from Bihar
Samyukta Socialist Party politicians
Praja Socialist Party politicians
Indian National Congress politicians
Rajya Sabha members from Bihar
1938 births
1982 deaths